The 84th Combat Sustainment Wing was a wing of the United States Air Force based at Hill Air Force Base, Utah from 2005 to 2014. Its history dates back to the 84th Fighter Wing of 1949.

Its mission was to provide system support manager functions for air-to-surface munitions, and multiple Command, Control, Communication and Intelligence (C3I) systems, and supply chain management for space systems, C3I systems, landing gear, power systems and multiple aircraft programs. Perhaps its most notable subordinate organization was the 84th Combat Sustainment Group.

History
The 84th Fighter Wing was established in 1949 as a reserve corollary unit of the 52d Fighter Wing at Mitchel AFB, New York but was not manned until it moved to McGuire AFB, New Jersey later that year.  Even after its move, the wing remained undermanned and performed little training.  It had no aircraft assigned, but flew North American F-82 Twin Mustang aircraft of the 52d Wing.  However, during its only active duty encampment it had only four pilots qualified to fly this aircraft.  It was called to active duty in 1951 for twenty-one months, but the day after it was activated its personnel were transferred to the 52d Fighter Wing.

The wing was reactivated in 2005 as part of the Air Force Materiel Command Transformation, which converted its traditional staff agency organizations into wings, groups, and squadrons.  It was originally assigned four functional groups, but all but one of the groups was inactivated by 2008.

The wing is also authorized the honors and history of its subordinate 84th Combat Sustainment Group, earned as a fighter group during World War II and as a component of Air Defense Command during the Cold War.

Lineage
 Constituted as the 84th Fighter Wing, All Weather on 16 May 1949
 Activated in the Reserve on 1 June 1949
 Redesignated as the 84th Fighter All-Weather Wing on 1 March 1950
 Ordered into active service on 1 June 1951
 Inactivated on 2 June 1951.
 Redesignated 84th Combat Sustainment Wing on 15 January 2005
 Activated 24 February 2005
 Inactivated in 2014

Assignments
 First Air Force, 1 June 1949 (attached to 52d Fighter Wing)
 Eastern Air Defense Force, 1 September 1950 – 2 June 1951 (remained attached to 52d Fighter-Interceptor Wing)
 Ogden Air Logistics Center, 24 February 2005 –

Components

 84th Air Base Group: 1 June 1949 – 2 June 1951
 84th Commodities Sustainment Group: 24 February 2005 – 28 April 2006
 84th Fighter Group, All Weather (later 84th Fighter All-Weather Group, 84th Space and Command, Control, Communications and Intelligence Sustainment Group, 84th Combat Sustainment Group): 1 June 1949 – 2 June 1951, 24 February 2005 –
 84th Maintenance & Supply Group: 1 June 1949 – 2 June 1951
 84th Materiel Sustainment Group: 24 February 2005 – 28 April 2006

 84th Medical Group: 1 June 1949 – 2 June 1951
 84th Specialized Management Sustainment Group: 24 February 2005 – 28 April 2006
 784th Combat Sustainment Group: 28 April 2006 – 30 June 2010
 884th Combat Sustainment Group: 28 April 2006 – 28 April 2008
 984th Combat Sustainment Group: 28 April 2006 – 28 April 2008

Stations
 Mitchel AFB, NY, 1 June 1949
 McGuire AFB, NJ, 10 October 1949 – 2 June 1951
 Hill AFB, UT, 24 February 2005 –

References

Notes

Bibliography

External links
Hill AFB Home Page

Military units and formations in Utah
0084
Military units and formations established in 1949
Military units and formations disestablished in 2014